The Sanremo Music Festival 1975 was the 25th annual Sanremo Music Festival, held at the Casinò Municipale in Sanremo, province of Imperia between 27 February and 1 March 1975. The final night was broadcast by Rai 1, while the first two nights were broadcast live only by radio.

The show was presented by  Mike Bongiorno, assisted by Sabina Ciuffini.  

  

Because of some disagreements with the Comune of Sanremo (organizer of the event), the major record companies decided to boycott the event not entering their major names in the competition. The winner of the Festival was Gilda with  "Ragazza del sud", a song which was criticized because of its use of stereotypes about people of South Italy.

Participants and results

References 

Sanremo Music Festival by year
1975 in Italian music
1975 music festivals